The Cuyabeno River is located in Sucumbios, Ecuador. The river starts in the high part of the Cuyabeno Reserve and ends in the Aguarico River. In the Siona - Secoya language, Cuyabeno means "Kindness River"".

References

Rivers of Ecuador
Upper Amazon